Try Anthony Bennett Grant (born 5 August 1975) is a Costa Rican former footballer.

Club career
Bennett made his professional debut for Saprissa on 3 October 1993 against Puntarenas and played the majority of his career for Saprissa. He had brief stints abroad with Guatemalan sides Comunicaciones and USAC.

He also played for Herediano and finished his career at Brujas whom he joined in summer 2008.

With Saprissa, he has won four national championships and two CONCACAF Champions Cup, and was part of the team that played the 2005 FIFA Club World Championship Toyota Cup, where Saprissa finished third behind São Paulo Futebol Clube and Liverpool F.C.

Doping conviction and retirement
In February 2010, Bennett was suspended for two months after he tested positive of dexamethasone in a doping test after the December 2009 championship play-off against Puntarenas.

He retired in March 2010 and a year later took the reins at third division side UNED.

International career
Bennett played in the 1995 FIFA World Youth Championship held in Qatar.

He made his senior debut for Costa Rica in an October 2002 friendly match against Ecuador and has earned a total of 24 caps, scoring 1 goal. He has represented his country in 3 FIFA World Cup qualification matches and played at the 2003 and 2007 UNCAF Nations Cups as well as at the 2003 CONCACAF Gold Cup and the 2004 Copa América.

His final international was a February 2007 UNCAF Nations Cup match against El Salvador.

International goals
Scores and results list Costa Rica's goal tally first.

Personal life
His brother Jéwisson Bennett also played for the national team.

References

External links

1975 births
Living people
Association football defenders
Costa Rican footballers
Costa Rica international footballers
2003 UNCAF Nations Cup players
2003 CONCACAF Gold Cup players
2004 Copa América players
2007 UNCAF Nations Cup players
Deportivo Saprissa players
Comunicaciones F.C. players
Universidad de San Carlos players
C.S. Herediano footballers
Brujas FC players
Costa Rican expatriate footballers
Expatriate footballers in Guatemala
Costa Rican sportspeople in doping cases
Doping cases in association football
Costa Rican football managers
Copa Centroamericana-winning players